The Hall of Fame tournament was a golf tournament on the PGA Tour from 1973 to 1982. It was played at the Pinehurst Country Club in Pinehurst, North Carolina which was home to the World Golf Hall of Fame at the time.

It was first played in 1973 as the World Open Golf Championship and was a unique event. It was a 144-hole tournament (twice the normal size) contested over two weeks. The 240 player field was cut after 72 holes to the top 70 plus ties who played the remaining 72 holes. It offered the largest purse ($500,000) and first place prize ($100,000) in PGA Tour history. For the rest of its existence it was played as a standard 72-hole event with purses in line with other PGA Tour events. The purse for the 1982 event was $250,000 with $45,000 going to the winner.

In 1983, a Senior PGA Tour event, the Hall of Fame Tournament, was played at Pinehurst.

Winners

External links
Hall of Fame Tournament results from GolfObserver.com - Final scores and earnings of each event played from 1973 to 1982

Former PGA Tour events
Golf in North Carolina
Recurring sporting events established in 1973
Recurring sporting events disestablished in 1982
1973 establishments in North Carolina
1982 disestablishments in North Carolina